The term minimum distance may refer to
 Minimum distance estimation, a statistical method for fitting a model to data
 Closest pair of points problem, the algorithmic problem of finding two points that have the minimum distance among a larger set of points
 Euclidean distance, the minimum length of any curve between two points in the plane
 Shortest path problem, the minimum length of a path between two points in a graph
 The minimum distance of a block code in coding theory, the smallest Hamming distance between any two of its code words